Graf Brothers Flooring and Lumber specializes in, and is the world's largest manufacturer of, rift and quarter sawn oak products. Rift & Quartered lumber results from a unique way of sawing that maximizes the yield of lumber with vertical grain. Vertical grain is preferred because of its excellent technical properties. Lumber that has been sawed using this method expands evenly and vertically. Vertical grain also increases the structural integrity of the wood.

Graf Brothers sells approximately half of its lumber to distribution yards and flooring and millwork manufacturers, and the other half goes into its own flooring production. Graf Bros maintains lumber inventory at four different warehouses on the West Coast. The company's flooring is shipped to distributors in Europe, Japan, and Asia, as well as 260 flooring distributors in North America. Graf Brothers also has a sales office in Brussels, Belgium.

All of these facilities have been built since the site was  acquired in 2003. Graf Brothers also operates satellite log yards in Vanceburg, Kentucky, and Prichard, West Virginia. In addition to its own mill, Graf Brothers is supplied by two dedicated contract sawmills, Brown Brothers Lumber in Otway, Ohio, and Redoutey Lumber in Henley, Ohio. The flooring is molded exclusively by Graf Brothers at its South Shore, Kentucky plant.

Graf Bros partakes in two practices that are unique to the lumber and flooring industries. The second unique practice is offering sorted or fixed widths in rift and quarter sawn lumber in almost any width the customer wants.

On December 30, 2017, a fire broke out in its main lumber storage facility. The  building was deemed a total loss.

References

External links
Graf Brothers Flooring and Lumber

Companies based in Kentucky